Vytautas Šapranauskas (19 April 1958 – 18 April 2013) was a Lithuanian comedy and drama actor of theatre and cinema, and an anchor of TV programs. According to the chairman of the Lithuanian Union of Actors, he was one of Lithuania's most talented actors, both in comedy and drama.

In 1980, he graduated from the Lithuanian Academy of Music and Theatre. Until 1990, he was affiliated with the Russian Drama Theatre, and from 1990 he was with the Vilnius Small Theatre.

He acted in a number of films, both during the Soviet times and in independent Lithuania.

Later he was a TV host and a jury member of a number of TV shows, such as Lithuania's Got Talent, X Faktorius, and Clash of the Choirs. He appeared in the film Redirected, a Lithuanian-British gangster action-comedy film. The film features four friends turned first–time robbers who get stranded in Eastern Europe and have to find their way back home. The film premiered in Lithuania on 10 January 2014 and was released in the United Kingdom on 13 November 2014. The film was dedicated to Vytautas Šapranauskas.

Death 
He committed suicide just before his 55th birthday. Before killing himself, he texted several friends about his intentions, but nobody believed him, knowing him as a comedian.

Filmography

References

1958 births
2013 deaths
20th-century Lithuanian male actors
Lithuanian male film actors
Lithuanian male stage actors
2013 suicides
Burials at Antakalnis Cemetery
Suicides by hanging
Suicides in Lithuania